Formoso is a municipality in northern Minas Gerais state, Brazil. It is located northeast of Brasília, in a pocket where the boundaries of the states of Minas Gerais, Goiás, and Bahia come together.

Formoso is part of the statistical micro-region of Unaí, which consists of the municipalities of Arinos, Bonfinópolis de Minas, Buritis, Cabeceira Grande, Dom Bosco, Formoso, Natalândia, Unaí, and Uruana de Minas.  The population of this micro-region was 133,168 (2000) in a total area of 27,653 km2.  The population density of the region is very low, 4.82 inhabitants/km2 in 2000.

There are highway connections, MG-400 then GO-108 with Sítio d'Abadia, 14 kilometers to the north in Goiás.  From Sítio there are unpaved (2001) highway connections (GO-112) with Alvorada do Norte on the BR-020 highway (Salvador-Brasília), a distance of 69 kilometers.

Formoso is north of the Grande Sertão Veredas National Park, created in 1989.  This park is a natural area protecting the flora and fauna of the cerrado, but not open to the public.Ambiente Brasil

The economy
The economy is based on cattle raising and agriculture, especially the growing of corn, rice, and soybeans.  In 2005 there were 5 small transformation industries and 74 commercial retail establishments.  Public administration employed 263 workers.  There were no financial institutions as of 2005.
The number of motor vehicles was 116 automobiles and 49 pickup trucks in 2007.

Main crops in area in 2006
Coffee: 115 ha.
Oranges: 110 ha.
Hearts of palm: 60 ha.
Rice: 1,200 ha.
Beans: 2,300 ha.
Corn: 6,100 ha.
Soybeans: 18,900 ha.

Farm data for 2006
Number of farms: 598
Agricultural area: 106,302 ha.
Planted area: 16,600 ha.
Area of natural pasture: 51,659
Salaried workers: 49
Workers who are related to producer: 1,767

Health and education
Hospitals: none (2005)
Health clinics: 3
Primary schools: 10
Primary school enrollment: 1,725
Middle schools: 1
Middle school enrollment: 309
Higher education: none
Municipal Human Development Index: 695 Frigoletto

History
The settlement of this region began in the second half of the eighteenth century with movement along the Picada da Bahia trail, made official in
1736 by King João V, who authorized the building of a tax collecting office on the border between Minas Gerais and Goiás, about 70 km from the present-day city of Formoso, in order to control the commerce of gold and cattle between the valley of the São Francisco River and the mines of the region of Goiás.  At that time the region was occupied by ranchers from the north of Minas Gerais.  The population grew slowly and in
1870 Formoso became a district belonging to the municipality of São Romão.  In 1923 the district was granted status as a vila, or town.  In 1962 it became a municipality.

References

IBGE Cidades
Frigoletto

Municipalities in Minas Gerais